The Tobago Plantations Seniors Classic was a senior (over 50s) men's professional golf tournament played on the Caribbean island of Tobago, part of Trinidad and Tobago. It was an early season event on the European Seniors Tour, played annually from 2002 to 2005. It was hosted by the Tobago Plantations Golf Club, Lowlands, Tobago. The 2005 event had prize money of US$250,000 with the winner receiving $37,500.

Winners

External links
Coverage on the European Senior Tour's official site (2005)
Coverage on the European Senior Tour's official site (2004)
Coverage on the European Senior Tour's official site (2003 and 2002)

Former European Senior Tour events
Sport in Trinidad and Tobago
Recurring sporting events established in 2002
Recurring sporting events disestablished in 2005